Schönborn may refer to:

Places 
 Schönborn, Brandenburg, in the Elbe-Elster district, Brandenburg
 Bad Schönborn, in the district of Karlsruhe, Baden-Württemberg
 Schönborn, Rhein-Hunsrück, in the Rhein-Hunsrück district, Rhineland-Palatinate
 Schönborn, Rhein-Lahn, in the Rhein-Lahn-Kreis district, Rhineland-Palatinate
 Schönborn, Donnersbergkreis, in the Donnersbergkreis district, Rhineland-Palatinate
 Schönborn, Saxony, location of a windmill in Saxony
 Schönborn (state), a former principality of the Holy Roman Empire

People 

 Eleonore Schönborn (1920–2022)

The House of Schönborn counts several prelates of the Roman Catholic Church: 

 Johann Philipp von Schönborn (1605–1673), Archbishop of Mainz, Bishop of Würzburg and Worms
 Lothar Franz von Schönborn (1655–1729), Archbishop of Mainz (1695–1729) and Bishop of Bamberg (1693)
 Damian Hugo Philipp von Schönborn (1676–1743), Prince Bishop of Speyer (1719–1743), Bishop of Konstanz (1740) and a cardinal
 Philipp Franz von Schönborn (1673–1724), Bishop of Würzburg (1719–1725)
 Franz Georg von Schönborn (1682–1756), Archbishop of Trier (1729–1756) and Bishop of Worms (1732)
 Friedrich Karl von Schönborn (1674–1746), Bishop of Bamberg and Bishop of Würzburg (1729–1746)
 Franziskus von Paula Graf von Schönborn (1844–1899), Cardinal Archbishop of Prague
 Christoph Schönborn (born 1945), Cardinal Archbishop of Vienna

See also 
 
 Schoenborn

German-language surnames